Karasf (also Romanized as Karsof; also known as Karafs and Qarasf) is a city in the Central District of Khodabandeh County, Zanjan province, Iran. At the 2006 census, its population was 2,869 in 753 households, when it was a village. The following census in 2011 counted 4,381 people in 1,221 households. The latest census in 2016 showed a population of 3,083 people in 965 households, by which time the village had been elevated to the status of a city.

References 

Khodabandeh County

Cities in Zanjan Province

Populated places in Zanjan Province

Populated places in Khodabandeh County